Campbell Roger "Buddy" Palmer (born 29 April 1936) is a Canadian boxer. He competed in the men's lightweight event at the 1964 Summer Olympics. At the 1964 Summer Olympics, he defeated Gabriel Achy Assi of the Ivory Coast, before losing to Stoyan Pilichev of Bulgaria. Prior to competing at the Olympics, he competed in Haney, British Columbia and 100 Mile House, British Columbia.

References

1936 births
Living people
Canadian male boxers
Olympic boxers of Canada
Boxers at the 1964 Summer Olympics
Place of birth missing (living people)
Lightweight boxers